Majhoor is a village in Shaheed Bhagat Singh Nagar district of Punjab State, India. The village is administrated by Sarpanch an elected representative of the village.

Demography 
As of 2011, Majhoor has a total number of 143 houses and population of 724 of which 366 include are males while 358 are females according to the report published by Census India in 2011. The literacy rate of Majhoor is 78.21%, higher than the state average of 75.84%. The population of children under the age of 6 years is 63 which is 8.70% of total population of Majhoor, and child sex ratio is approximately 750 as compared to Punjab state average of 846.

Most of the people are from Schedule Caste which constitutes 41.30% of total population in Majhoor. The town does not have any Schedule Tribe population so far.

As per the report published by Census India in 2011, 229 people were engaged in work activities out of the total population of Majhoor which includes 183 males and 46 females. According to census survey report 2011, 87.34% workers describe their work as main work and 12.66% workers are involved in Marginal activity providing livelihood for less than 6 months.

Education 
The village has a Punjabi medium, co-ed upper primary school established in 1977. The school provide mid-day meal as per Indian Midday Meal Scheme. As per Right of Children to Free and Compulsory Education Act the school provide free education to children between the ages of 6 and 14.

KC Engineering College and Doaba Khalsa Trust Group Of Institutions are the nearest colleges.

List of schools nearby:
Dashmesh Model School, Kahma
Govt Primary School, Kahlon
Govt High School, Garcha

Transport 

See also 
List of villages in India

References

External links 
 Tourism of Punjab
 Census of Punjab
 Locality Based PINCode

Villages in Shaheed Bhagat Singh Nagar district